The Al Bayda offensive began in late July 2020 with the restart of military operations by Houthis forces in Al Bayda Governorate, during the Second Yemeni Civil War against forces of Al-Qaeda in Yemen, the Islamic State in Yemen and military forces loyal to the Government of Abd Rabbuh Mansur Al-Hadi.

Prelude
In early 2020, Houthi forces were achieving territorial gains in al-Jawf Governorate and Marib along the main highway that links those governorates, with the aim of controlling the Bayda-Marib axis.

The battle
On 21 June, Houthis-led forces fought its way in the Baydha Governorate, with the aim on reaching Mahilia area and attack Marib by the South. According to Pro-Hadi government media the Houthi offensive on Al-Nahma area, Mahliyah District of Marib, left tribesmen loyal to the government and soldiers in a dire situation of being attacked from the South.

On 30 June, Houthi forces made further advances on the north of Badya and the south of Marib, seizing 400 km2 of terrain and inflicting 250 killed, wounded and captured Pro-Hadi Government forces.

On 12 August, Houthi sources reported advances on the Marib front against ISIS and Al-Qaeda forces located in the southeast of Marib and Saudi led forces in the southwest.

On 19 August, the spokesperson of the Houthi movement, Gen. Yahya al-Sari, said that after military operations the districts of Walad Rabi and Quraishiyah were captured by Houthi forces. According to al-Sari Houthi forces seized 1,000 km2 of terrain from control of Jihadist groups (Al-Qaeda and Islamic State in Yemen), inflicted 250 killed, wounded and captured whilst destroying 12 enemy bases.

On 22 August, Houthi media revealed the advances made by Houthi fighters against Al-Qaeda and Islamic State forces in Badya. According to Yemeni media Houthi fighters seized M47 Dragon missiles, M2 Browning machine guns and supplies of the World Food Programme from jihadist forces.

Aftermath 
On 23 September 2021, Houthi forces said they captured three districts from Al-Badya governorate effectively controlling the province. The Ministry of Defense of the Houthi government dubbed  the result as a "strategic victory" over Al-Qaeda and ISIS-Y.

References

2020 in Yemen
Yemeni Civil War (2014–present)
Conflicts in 2020
Al Bayda Governorate
July 2020 events in Yemen
August 2020 events in Yemen